Robert Warner (1510–1575) was an English politician.

He was a Member (MP) of the Parliament of England for Chippenham in 1545, Wilton in 1547, Downton in March 1553, and Bossiney in 1559.

References

1510 births
1575 deaths
English MPs 1545–1547
English MPs 1547–1552
English MPs 1553 (Edward VI)
English MPs 1559
Members of the pre-1707 English Parliament for constituencies in Cornwall